The Takoma Park Historic District is a national historic district located at Takoma Park, Montgomery County, Maryland. The district area was platted in 1883 by developer Benjamin Franklin Gilbert, and promoted for its natural environment and healthy setting. Originally an early railroad suburb, the opening of streetcar lines led to the expansion of the district in the early 20th century. Takoma Park houses built between 1883 and 1900 are fanciful, turreted, multi-gabled affairs of Queen Anne architecture with Stick Style and Shingle Style influence. Buildings developed after the turn of the 20th century tend to be 1-2 story brick structures with simple ornamentation, although a few display characteristics of such styles as Art Deco and Tudor Revival.

It was listed on the National Register of Historic Places in 1976.

References

External links
, including photo in 2003, at Maryland Historical Trust website
Boundary Map of the Takoma Park Historic District, Montgomery County, at Maryland Historical Trust

Historic districts on the National Register of Historic Places in Maryland
Historic districts in Montgomery County, Maryland
Takoma Park, Maryland
National Register of Historic Places in Montgomery County, Maryland